Fugitive Pieces is a novel by Canadian poet and novelist Anne Michaels. The story is divided into two sections. The first centers around Jakob Beer, a Polish Holocaust survivor while the second involves a man named Ben, the son of two Holocaust survivors. It was first published in Canada in 1996 and was published in the United Kingdom the following year. Since the publication, the novel has won awards such as Books in Canada First Novel Award, the Trillium Book Award, Orange Prize for Fiction, Guardian Fiction Prize and the Jewish Quarterly-Wingate Prize. For over two years the novel was on Canada's bestseller list, and it was translated into over 20 different languages.

Plot
The novel is split into two sections: Book I and Book II.

Book I 
Jakob Beer is a 7-year-old child of a Jewish family living in Poland. His house is stormed by Nazis; he escapes the fate of his parents and his sister, Bella, by hiding behind the wallpaper in a cabinet. He hides in the forest, burying himself up to the neck in the soil. After some time, he runs into an archaeologist, Athos Roussos, working on Biskupin. Athos secretly takes him to Zakynthos in Greece. Athos is also a geologist, and is fascinated with ancient wood and stones. Jakob learns Greek and English, but finds that learning new languages erases his memory of the past. After the war, Athos and Jakob move to Toronto, where after several years Jakob meets Alexandra in a music library. Alex is a fast-paced, outspokenly philosophical master of wordplay. Jakob and Alex fall in love and marry, but the relationship fails because Alex expects Jakob to change too fast and abandon his past. Jakob dwells constantly on his memories of Bella, especially her piano-playing, and they end up divorcing. Jakob meets and marries Michaela, a much younger woman but one who seems to understand him, and with Michaela's help he is able to let go of Bella. Together they move to Greece into the former home of several generations of the Roussos family.

Book II 
The second part of the book is told from the perspective of Ben, a Canadian professor of Jewish descent who was born in Canada to survivors of the Holocaust. In 1954 the family home in Weston, Ontario is destroyed by Hurricane Hazel. Ben becomes an expert on the history of weather, and marries a girl named Naomi. He is a big admirer of Jakob's poetry and respects the way he deals with the Holocaust, when Ben himself has trouble coping with the horrors his parents must have endured. At the end of the novel, Ben is sent to retrieve Jakob's journals from his home in Greece, where Ben spends hours swimming in Jakob's past.

Main characters 
 Jakob Beer—The only survivor of his town who is found and rescued by Athos. He is an intelligent boy who later becomes a renowned poet.    
 Athos Roussos—A geologist who rescues Jakob and becomes his guardian. He teaches Jakob about the beauty of science and also the world.     
 Ben—An admirer of Jakob and his poetry. He travels to Greece to find Jakob's journals.

Theme, style and structure 
Fugitive Pieces contains themes of trauma, grief, loss, and memory, primarily in relation to the Holocaust, which Michaels explores via metaphors such as nature. The work is told in a poetic style, which has caused some critics to view it as an elegy, and others, such as Donna Coffey, to feel that it re-imagines the literary telling of the Holocaust and also of nature. The story is told through two narratives, in the first part, Jakob's, then in the second part, Ben's, which are connected through one main event that had an effect on both narrators. John Mullan has stated that he feels that the book shows how the Holocaust and traumatic moments can impact generations of survivors and their family members. Fugitive Pieces also contains mentions of the senses, which are shown through an emphasis of Jakob hearing what happened to his family, rather than seeing the event take place, which in turns adds to his trauma and his inability to gain closure. Similarly, Ben has only heard stories but never had first hand experience. Michaels uses this to convey a paradox between what we hear, the language, and then the silence that follows due to the suffering and trauma of others.

The title of the novel is taken from Fugitive Pieces, Lord Byron's first volume of verse, privately printed in the autumn of 1806.

Reception
Along with winning many awards, Michaels has received praise from multiple media outlets and academics such as University College London professor John Mullan and Michiko Kakutani.

On November 5, 2019, the BBC News listed Fugitive Pieces on its list of the 100 most influential novels.

Film adaptation

The novel was made into a feature film produced by Robert Lantos through his Toronto-based Serendipity Point Films Inc. It opened at the 2007 Toronto International Film Festival. It was directed by Jeremy Podeswa, based on his screenplay adaptation of the Michaels novel. It stars Stephen Dillane as Jakob Beer and Rade Šerbedžija as Athos.

Sources
 Eugene Benson and William Toye, eds. The Oxford Companion to Canadian Literature.  Toronto: Oxford University Press, 1997: 753–754.
 W. H. New, ed. Encyclopedia of Literature in Canada. Toronto: University of Toronto Press, 2002: 740.

References

1996 Canadian novels
Novels by Anne Michaels
Novels set in Toronto
Novels about orphans
Women's Prize for Fiction-winning works
Canadian novels adapted into films
Guardian Fiction Prize-winning works
1996 debut novels
McClelland & Stewart books